Park Duk-Kyu (Hangul: 박덕규, Hanja: 朴德奎) (born October 29, 1972) is a former South Korean amateur boxer.

Results

1991 World Championships

1992 Summer Olympics

External links
sports-reference

Living people
Boxers at the 1992 Summer Olympics
Olympic boxers of South Korea
1972 births
South Korean male boxers
AIBA World Boxing Championships medalists
Featherweight boxers